Kevin E. Lowe is a finance executive and retired professional lacrosse player who played professional box lacrosse in the National Lacrosse League and  professional field lacrosse in Major League Lacrosse from 1995 to 2006. He starred as a member of the Princeton Tigers men's lacrosse team from 1991 through 1994 and was inducted into the Lacrosse Museum and National Hall of Fame in 2009, joining his brother and father. He was a high school and college lacrosse United States Intercollegiate Lacrosse Association (USILA) All-American.  Lowe has the distinction of being the only player in lacrosse history to score an overtime goal in an NCAA Men's Lacrosse Championship game and a Major League Lacrosse Steinfeld Cup championship game.  He holds numerous Princeton scoring records and formerly held the Ivy League single-season assists record.  As a college senior, he was honored as the National Collegiate Athletic Association's best lacrosse attackman and the Ivy League's best player. In his four-year college career, Princeton won its first two NCAA tournament Championship, two Ivy League Championships and earned four NCAA Men's Lacrosse Championship tournament invitations.

Background
He is the brother of 1992 Division I Player of the Year and Hall of Famer Darren Lowe and son of Hall of Famer Alan Lowe. Alan, who was the longtime Manhasset High School coach, had won both a World Lacrosse Championship and NCAA Men's Lacrosse Championship. Lowe was a high school All-American from Mineola, New York who received numerous prep accolades: National High School North/South Lacrosse All-Star Game (1990), Nassau County All-Star Game (1990) and Empire State Games (1989).  Lowe is currently married with three children.  As a youth he played soccer, the quarterback position in American football and the point guard position in basketball.  He is currently a stockbroker on Wall Street.

College career
Including the 2009 season, Lowe holds the 5th highest career total in NCAA Division I with 174 assists. Lowe holds numerous Princeton University scoring records (career points, career assists, single-game assists, consecutive games with a point, and points by a freshman).  He formerly held the school records for single-season points and single-season assists.  Lowe formerly held the Ivy League career assists record.  However, since the Ivy League uses conference games only, Ryan Boyle now holds the career assists record although Lowe holds the school record.  Lowe is the only Tiger to have scored a point in all of Princeton's games during his career (Boyle scored in all games he played but missed 4 games). His final career goal clinched the 1994 NCAA Division I Men's Lacrosse Championship for the Tigers in overtime. Princeton was 52–8 during Lowe's career, including a 7–2 record in four NCAA tournaments. The 1992 and 1993 teams were undefeated 6–0 outright Ivy League champions,

As a freshman, on April 6, 1991, he led number three ranked Princeton to a 17–9 victory over Yale.  It was Princeton's first victory over Yale since 1986.  Lowe had nine assists, which set a school single-game record. As of 2010, this continues to be a Princeton single-game record.  After the tenth game of the season, Lowe continued to lead the nation in assists.  He was the leading scorer on Princeton's team that won the 1992 NCAA Division I Men's Lacrosse Championship to win its first NCAA tournament. As a senior in 1994, his 73 assists in league games broke his brother Darren's 1992 Ivy League single season record and earned him Ivy League Player of the Year honors. In the 1994 NCAA Division I Men's Lacrosse Championship game, he scored the game-winning goal in sudden death overtime against Virginia.  After Princeton won the face-off, the goal came on the first shot on goal of overtime. When his collegiate eligibility ended, he had the four highest single-season assist totals in school history.

Lowe was the Jack Turnbull Award and Men's Ivy League Player of the Year Award winner for 1994.  He was a first team USILA All-American Team selection in 1994 and a second team selection in 1992 and 1993.  He was a four-time All-Ivy League selection and three-time first team All-Ivy League selection (1992, 1993, & 1994)

Princeton University

Club Lacrosse Career

Both Kevin Lowe and Darren Lowe played post-collegiate lacrosse for the famed Long Island-Hofstra lacrosse club. The Lowe brothers were well known for their “high IQ” patient offensive style. Both brothers played for the Long Island-Hofstra lacrosse club in the storied 1996 USCLA Championship (held at Cabrini College) victory over the highly favored Team Toyota which featured Quint Kessenich, Gary Gait, and Paul Gait.

Professional career
Lowe played in the indoor National Lacrosse League from 1995 to 2001 and the outdoor Major League Lacrosse from 2003 to 2006. He played with the New York Saints of the NLL in 1995, 1996, 2000 and 2001. Then he played in the MLL with the Long Island Lizards in 2003 and 2004 and the Philadelphia Barrage in 2006. In 2003, he was selected to his first MLL All-Star Game, he was injured and instead served as an assistant coach during the game.  He was leading the league in assists and had tied the league single-game assists record (6) prior to injury.  He and his brother were teammates for the United States at the 2002 World Lacrosse Championship, where they won the championship. In the semifinal match against the Iroquois Nation, he scored four goals and had an assist.  His overtime goal in the 2003 MLL Championship game earned the Long Island Lizards the Steinfeld Cup. It occurred only 22 seconds into the overtime period to give the Lizards the victory over the Baltimore Bayhawks whom they had met in each of the first three MLL championships. Lowe scored four goals and added an assist in the 15–14 victory to earn the MLL Championship MVP award.  Lowe, who was second in the MLL with 20 assists, injured his knee during the 2004 season and missed the rest of the year.

NLL stats
The following are his NLL career stats:

MLL stats
The following are his MLL career stats:

References

External links
Lowe at the Lacrosse Museum and National Hall of Fame
Lowe at the National Lacrosse League
Team USA recordbook for World Lacrosse Championship

Living people
Lacrosse forwards
New York Lizards players
New York Saints players
Philadelphia Barrage players
Princeton Tigers men's lacrosse players
Stockbrokers
Year of birth missing (living people)
Lacrosse players from New York (state)
People from Mineola, New York
Sportspeople from Nassau County, New York